Linha do Douro is a railway in northern Portugal. For much of its route the line runs close to the Douro River, offering very scenic views of the river and valley. Trains on the line are operated by Comboios de Portugal (CP).

Construction

Route
From west to east, the line runs from the junction at Ermesinde to Pocinho. The line formerly continued east for a further 28 kilometres to the Spanish border. Until 1984, the track connected to a Spanish line, thus allowing through trains to/from Salamanca.

Passenger trains normally run from São Bento station in Porto to Pocinho, with some not running as far as the eastern terminus. The line is single track, apart from a double track section between Ermesinde and Valongo (the authorisation for the dualling work was given by CP in 1993).

In 1984, the Spanish rail operator RENFE announced the closure of its connecting line from La Fuente de San Esteban to the Portuguese border. With the loss of international traffic, CP had to close its line east of Barca d'Alva to Spain. The service was cut back to Pocinho in 1988, which has since remained the eastern terminus of the Douro line.

Branch lines
There were formerly five metre gauge branch lines connecting with the Douro line, but the last of these closed in 2009. Geographically, from west to east they were:
The Penafiel to Lixa and Entre-os-Rios Railway, which closed in the 1920s after less than 20 years of service
The Tâmega line, which closed in 2009 and ran north from a junction with Douro line at Livração
The Corgo line, which closed in 2009 and ran north from a junction with Douro line at Regua
The Tua line, which closed in 2008 and ran north from a junction with Douro line at Tua
The Sabor line, which closed in 1988 and ran north-east from a junction with Douro line at Pocinho

See also
List of railway lines in Portugal
List of Portuguese locomotives and railcars
History of rail transport in Portugal
CP Class 1400 - diesel locomotives frequently used on the line
National Railway Museum (Portugal)
Sorefame - builder of most of the rolling stock used on the line
Barca d'Alva–La Fuente de San Esteban railway

References

Sources
 

D
Railway lines opened in 1875
Iberian gauge railways